Elizabeth Fetterhoff is an American politician. Affiliated with the Republican Party, she has served on the Florida House of Representatives since 2018, representing the 26th district.

Early life 
In 1981, Fetterhoff was born in DeLand, Florida. Fetterhoff's father is Roy Schleicher, a former politician. Fetterhoff's mother is Senta Goudy, a former reporter.

Education 
In 2009, Fetterhoff graduated with a BS degree in political science from Florida State University.

Career
Fetterhoff served in the Florida Army National Guard.

Fetterhoff was a legislative assistant to Senator Dorothy Hukill. Fetterhoff is a government affairs director for the New Smyrna Beach Board of Realtor.

Fetterhoff narrowly defeated Michael Cantu in the August 28, 2018 Republican primary, winning by just 81 votes. In the November 8, 2018 general election, Fetterhoff narrowly defeated the incumbent, Patrick Henry, by just 61 votes, in a margin that triggered a manual recount.

References

External links 
 Elizabeth Fetterhoff at Ballotpedia.org

1981 births
Fetterhoff, Elizabeth
Living people
People from DeLand, Florida
21st-century American politicians
Women state legislators in Florida
21st-century American women politicians
Florida State University alumni